Munroturuttu railway station or Mundrothuruthu railway station (Code:MQO) is an 'HG 2 Category' halt railway station, situated between  and  railway stations of Kollam district in Kerala state, India. The station is coming under the Southern Railway zone of Indian Railways. The nearest major rail head of Munrothuruthu railway station is Kollam Junction railway station.

Location
Munroe Island (also called as Mundrothuruthu) is an island located at the union of Ashtamudi Lake and the Kallada River. It was one of the old settlements of Dutch who had arrived at Kerala. This place is named as an honor to Colonel John Munro, who was the divan or the prime minister of the former Princely State of Travancore. Mundrothuruthu is a tourism spot situated at the outskirts of Kollam city, about 25 km away from the city proper. This backwater marvel is attracting a huge number of tourists every day. The Kayal(Lake) Pradakshina Cruise operated by local boat owner are available here in Mundrothuruthu. Narrow waterways, canals, lagoons, and the islands of Pathupara are the other attractions of the Munroe Island. There are a number of coconut farms on either side of the waterways.

Services
Mundrothuruthu is well connected with various cities in India like Kollam, Trivandrum, Kochi, Thrissur, Kottayam, Alappuzha through Indian Railways.

Trains having halt at the station.

See also
 Kollam Junction railway station
 Karunagappalli railway station
 Paravur railway station
 Perinad railway station
 Sasthamkotta railway station

References

Munroturuttu
Thiruvananthapuram railway division
Railway stations opened in 1958
1958 establishments in Kerala